The 2021 UST Growling Tigers men's basketball team represented University of Santo Tomas in the 84th season of the University Athletic Association of the Philippines. The men's basketball tournament for the academic year 2021-22 began in the second semester on March 26, 2022, and the host school for the season was De La Salle University.

The Tigers tied their second worst record in the Final Four era after winning only three games against eleven losses which they also had in the 2016 season. After ending the first round of eliminations on a 2–5 record, the team won only one game before going on a six-game losing streak to end the tournament, which was marked by blowout losses that broke the UAAP record for the largest losing margins.

They began their season with a 25-point loss against the FEU Tamaraws in a game played behind closed doors. The UAAP had earlier decided to hold the first four playing schedules under a bubble setup in observance of COVID-19 safety precautions. UST had five more blowout losses in the season that included their 44-point marginal defeat against FEU in their last playing date in the second round to surpass their 43-point loss to the De La Salle Green Archers back in 2016. Their 50-point loss to the Ateneo Blue Eagles in the second round set the mark for the league's biggest losing margin since 2003. They also lost against the NU Bulldogs by 31 points in the first round, and by 29 points each to La Salle and the UP Fighting Maroons in the second round. Their 83–112 defeat against the Green Archers enabled their opponents to breach the 100-point barrier in the season.

Roster
UST has listed Ivan Lazarte, Rafael Pangilinan, Rafael Biag, and Patrick Javier on their reserve list, where any of the four players can be activated to replace players who would test positive for COVID-19.

=== Depth chart ===Depth chart

Roster changes
13 out of the 16 players from the 2019 UAAP runner-up team have departed. Renzo Subido, Zach Huang, and Enric Caunan have already graduated, while the majority went on to transfer to rival colleges at the height of the school's training bubble controversy. UAAP Season 82 Most Valuable Player Soulémane Chabi Yo forwent his final playing year in the collegiate ranks to play in the Liga EBA in Spain. The extended lockdowns and the cancellation of UAAP Season 83, despite the league's extension of eligibility of players caused the Beninese center's exit from the team.

Subtractions

Additions

Recruiting class

Schedule and results

Elimination games were played in a double round-robin format. All games were aired on One Sports and the UAAP Varsity Channel.

Individual statistics

|- bgcolor=#ffffdd
| Nic Cabañero || 14 || 7 || 25.4 || 62 || 159 || 39.0% || 12 || 49 || 24.5% || 38 || 68 || 55.9% || style=|6.3 || 1.5 || style=|1.0 || 0.1 || 2.9 || style=|12.4
|-
| Joshua Fontanilla || 14 || 10 || 23.1 || 60 || 154 || 39.0% || 10 || 39 || 25.6% || 33 || 50 || 66.0% || 3.6 || style=|3.8 || 0.9 || 0.0 || 4.6 || 11.6
|- bgcolor=#ffffdd
| Sherwin Concepcion || 14 || 12 || style=|26.6 || 52 || 149 || 34.9% || 33 || 111 || 29.7% || 12 || 20 || 60.0% || 5.6 || 0.7 || 0.5 || 0.1 || 1.4 || 10.6
|-
| Paul Manalang || 14 || 5 || 24.6 || 28 || 95 || 29.5% || 22 || 72 || style=|30.6% || 28 || 31 || 90.3% || 2.9 || 2.6 || 0.9 || 0.1 || 2.0 || 7.7
|- bgcolor=#ffffdd
| Bryan Santos || 11 || 3 || 18.1 || 25 || 77 || 32.5% || 13 || 50 || 26.05% || 8 || 15 || 53.3% || 5.9 || 0.5 || 0.6 || 0.3 || 0.8 || 6.5
|-
| Christian Manaytay || 14 || 4 || 15.9 || 25 || 58 || 43.1% || 0 || 2 || 0.0% || 19 || 36 || 52.8% || 3.9 || 0.9 || 0.4 || 0.4 || 1.4 || 4.9
|- bgcolor=#ffffdd
| Dave Ando || 14 || 7 || 14.8 || 26 || 68 || 38.2% || 1 || 15 || 6.7% || 4 || 15 || 26.7% || 5.3 || 0.3 || 0.3 || style=|0.6 || 1.0 || 4.1
|-
| Migs Pangilinan || 14 || 8 || 17.4 || 18 || 59 || 30.5% || 7 || 37 || 18.9% || 15 || 18 || 83.3% || 3.1 || 0.2 || 0.4 || 0.5 || 1.4 || 4.1
|- bgcolor=#ffffdd
| Jordi Gomez de Liaño || 12 || 1 || 5.5 || 9 || 34 || 26.5% || 7 || 27 || 25.9% || 0 || 1 || 0.0% || 1.6 || 0.3 || 0.3 || 0.0 || 0.3 || 2.1
|-
| Royce Mantua || 11 || 4 || 9.2 || 7 || 33 || 21.2% || 5 || 20 || 25.0% || 2 || 3 || 66.7% || 1.5 || 0.3 || 0.3 || 0.0 || 0.8 || 1.9
|- bgcolor=#ffffdd
| Jamba Garing || 10 || 1 || 9.2 || 5 || 13 || 38.5% || 2 || 7 || 28.6% || 2 || 4 || 50.0% || 1.2 || 0.6 || 0.5 || 0.0 || 0.8 || 1.4
|-
| Aldave Canoy || 9 || 0 || 4.1 || 4 || 7 || style=|57.1% || 1 || 3 || 33.3% || 4 || 5 || 80.0% || 0.2 || 0.1 || 0.1 || 0.3 || 0.3 || 1.4
|- bgcolor=#ffffdd
| Ian Herrera || 12 || 3 || 7.8 || 5 || 20 || 25.0% || 2 || 13 || 15.4% || 2 || 4 || 50.0% || 2.5 || 0.2 || 0.2 || 0.2 || 0.0 || 1.2
|-
| Renzel Yongco || 10 || 4 || 7.0 || 3 || 12 || 25.0% || 2 || 11 || 18.2% || 0 || 0 || 0.0% || 0.3 || 0.5 || 0.0 || 0.0 || 0.4 || 0.8
|- bgcolor=#ffffdd
| Bryan Samudio || 9 || 0 || 3.0 || 2 || 6 || 33.3% || 0 || 0 || 0.0% || 1 || 1 || style=|100.0% || 0.7 || 0.1 || 0.0 || 0.0 || 0.6 || 0.6
|-
| JJ Gesalem || 7 || 1 || 5.8 || 1 || 12 || 8.3% || 1 || 9 || 11.1% || 0 || 0 || 0.0% || 0.4 || 0.3 || 0.0 || 0.0 || 0.4 || 0.4
|- class=sortbottom
! Total || 14 || || 40.0 || 332 || 956 || 34.7% || 118 || 465 || 25.4% || 168 || 271 || 62.0% || 42.9 || 12.0 || 5.9 || 2.3 || 18.6 || 67.9
|- class=sortbottom
! Opponents || 14 || || 40.0 || 449 || 1,004 || 44.7% || 121 || 406 || 29.8% || 171 || 280 || 61.1% || 49.8 || 18.3 || 11.0 || 3.5 || 15.9 || 84.9
|}

Source: Imperium Technology

References

2021–22 in Philippine college basketball
UST Growling Tigers basketball team seasons